A jog dial, jog wheel, shuttle dial, or shuttle wheel is a type of knob, ring, wheel, or dial which allows the user to shuttle or jog through audio or video media.  It is commonly found on models of CD players which are made for disc jockeys, and on professional video equipment such as video tape recorders.  More recently, they are found on handheld PDAs, and as the scroll wheel on computer mice.  "Jog" refers to going at a very slow speed, whereas "shuttle" refers to a very fast speed.

There are two basic types of wheels.  One type has no stops and can be spun the entire way around, because it is a rotary incremental encoder.  This type depends on tracking the actual motion of the dial: the faster it spins forward or back, the faster it fast-forwards or rewinds.  Once the dial stops moving, the media continues playing or remains paused at that point.   Another type has stops on either side, and often has three or so speeds which depend on how far it is turned.  Once the wheel is released, it springs back to the middle position and the media pauses or begins playing again.
  

If the device is set or designed to pause after the wheel is used, the audio is often stuttered, repeating a small section over and over again.  This is usually done on DJ CD players, for the purpose of beatmatching, and is equivalent to an earlier turntablist DJ moving a phonograph record back and forth slightly to find the physical location of a starting beat within the groove.  On video, the pause is a freeze frame of the current video frame.

Sony Corporation holds a patent for a 5-way version of jog dial. A 5-way jog dial allows up and down scrolling, right and left deflections, and a press-to-click action. Such jog dial was a feature of Sony CLIÉ PDA series and Sony Ericsson P800, P900 and P910 smartphones. A 5-way jog dial has not been used by Sony or its subsidiaries since 2006.

See also
iPod click wheel
Dial box

References

External links

Audio engineering
Television technology
Computing input devices
Input/output